Pseudochazara schakuhensis is a species of butterfly in the family Nymphalidae. It is confined to the Alborz and Kopet-Dagh mountains.

Flight period 
The species is univoltine and is on wing from mid-July to September.

Food plants
Larvae feed on grasses.

References

 Satyrinae of the Western Palearctic - Pseudochazara schakuhensis

Pseudochazara
Butterflies described in 1881
Taxa named by Otto Staudinger
Butterflies of Asia